Hythe Road railway station is a proposed railway station in West London, UK. It will be located next to the planned Old Oak Common railway station and will offer interchange between London Overground and other rail services, including Crossrail (the Elizabeth Line) and High Speed 2. It is one of two proposed new stations which will connect with Old Oak Common, the other being  on the North London line.

, TfL's most recent position is that

Proposals
Construction work would involve re-aligning the track along a new railway embankment (built slightly to the north of the existing line) and demolishing industrial units along Salter Street, on land currently owned by a vehicle sales company ('Car Giant'). The station structure will sit on a viaduct, with a bus interchange underneath.

In October 2017, Transport for London began a public consultation on the construction of two new Overground stations, Hythe Road on the West London line and Old Oak Common Lane on the North London line.

References

Proposed London Overground stations